Ani-Anti was a village in the land of Nephi described by the Book of Mormon. It was probably located between the Lamanite cities of Jerusalem and Middoni. All three were inhabited by a considerable number of Nephite dissidents known as Amalekites. According to the Book of Mormon, the village was briefly visited by Nephite missionaries including Muloki and Ammah. They taught in the Amalekite synagogues until they were joined by their companion Aaron, who came to Ani-Anti from Jerusalem, and departed for the land of Middoni.

References

Book of Mormon places